was a district located in Ehime Prefecture, Japan.

History
 1878 — Uwa District was split up by Meiji era land reforms. Higashiuwa District was thus born. (1 town, 21 villages)
 January 1, 1914 — Parts of the village of Tanisuji was merged into the village of No.
 January 1, 1922 — The village of No was elevated to town status to become the town of Nomura. (2 towns, 20 villages)
 February 11, 1922 — The village of Kamiuwa was merged into the town of Uwa. (2 towns, 19 villages)
 December 1, 1929 — The villages of Kasagi and Yamada were merged to create the village of Iwaki. (2 towns, 18 villages)
 April 1, 1943, parts of the village of Ukena (from Kamiukena District) was merged into the village of Sōkawa.
 March 31, 1954 — The villages of Yusukawa, Doi, Takagawa and Uonashi were merged to create the village of Kurosegawa. (2 towns, 15 villages)
 March 31, 1954 — The villages of Tada, Nakagawa, Iwaki, Shimouwa and Tanosuji were merged into the town of Uwa. (2 towns, 10 villages)
 February 11, 1955 — The villages of Nakasuji, Tanisuji, Sōkawa, and parts of Kaibuki and Yokobayashi were merged into the town of Nomura. (2 towns, 7 villages)
 February 11, 1955 — Parts of the villages of Kaibuki and Yokobayashi merged into the village of Hijikawa in Kita District (now the city of Ōzu). (2 towns, 5 villages)
 March 31, 1955 — The villages of Tawarazu and Karie were merged to create the village of Toyoumi. (2 towns, 4 villages)
 March 31, 1955 — The village of Tamatsu was merged into the town of Yoshida (from Kitauwa District) (now the city of Uwajima). (2 towns, 3 villages)
 January 1, 1958 — The villages of Toyoumi and Takayama were merged to create the town of Akehama. (3 towns, 1 village)
 August 1, 1958 — parts of the city of Ōzu was merged into the town of Uwa.
 April 1, 1959 — The village of Kurosegawa was renamed and elevated to town status to become the town of Shirokawa. (4 towns)
 April 1, 2004 — The towns of Akehama, Nomura, Shirokawa and Uwa, along with the town of Mikame (from Nishiuwa District) were to create the city of Seiyo. Therefore, Higashiuwa District was dissolved as a result of this merger.

See also
List of dissolved districts of Japan

Higashiuwa District